Abha Saxena is a bioethicist and global health specialist. She was trained as an anesthesiologist, and practiced medicine for several years before moving to the World Health Organization in 2001. There she was heavily involved in bioethics work, coordinating the WHO Research ethics committee and Global Health Ethics Team. Since 2018, Saxena has been a visiting professor at the University of Geneva and a Senior Bioethics adviser at the INCLEN Trust International.

Education
Saxena completed her undergraduate degree, MBBS, and MD from the All India Institute of Medical Sciences, New Delhi, where she trained as an anesthesiologist.

Career
Saxena was a member of the faculty of the All India Institute of Medical Sciences, New Delhi from 1986 to 1999, during which time she taught and conducted research in anesthesiology and palliative care. For twenty years she practiced medicine actively in hospital and community-based research in India. 

In 2001, she joined the World Health Organization in Geneva, Switzerland. There, she managed the WHO Research ethics review committee from 2002 to 2018, and the Global Health Ethics Team from 2013 to 2018. In May 2018, Saxena left the World Health Organization and is now a visiting professor at the University of Geneva and a Senior Bioethics adviser at the INCLEN Trust International.

Personal life
Saxena is married to Shekhar Saxena, also of the World Health Organization, and together they live in Geneva, Switzerland.  They have two adult daughters..

Select publications
 Cash, R, Wikler, D, Saxena, A., Capron, A. Casebook on Ethical Issues in International Health Research, Geneva: World Health Organization, 2009, 2010.  Translated into five languages, including Arabic, Chinese, English, French, Russian, and Spanish.  ; second edition forthcoming.   (NLM classification: W 20.5).
 Saxena, A, Gomes, M. Ethical challenges to responding to the Ebola epidemic: The World Health Organization experience. Clinical Trials 2006 (January):13(1). .

References

External links
 Global Health Ethics of the World Health Organization
 ResearchGate profile for Abha Saxena, MD, where most published articles can be downloaded.

Year of birth missing (living people)
Living people
Indian anesthesiologists
World Health Organization officials
Indian ethicists
Medical doctors from Delhi
Indian women medical doctors
20th-century Indian medical doctors
20th-century Indian women scientists
Indian officials of the United Nations
20th-century women physicians
Women anesthesiologists
Bioethicists